Céline Dumerc (born 9 July 1982) is a French professional basketball player. She was named the FIBA Europe Women's Player of the Year in 2012, and the French Player of the Year in 2017.

National team career
Dumerc is the captain of the senior women's French national team. She was France's leading scorer at the 2012 London Summer Olympics, where she won the silver medal.

Awards and accomplishments

Pro clubs
5× French Women's Cup Winner: (2005, 2006, 2008, 2009, 2014)
3× French Women's Federation Cup Winner: (2006, 2007, 2008)
7× French Women's League Champion: (2006, 2008, 2009, 2012, 2013, 2015, 2021)
Russian Women's Cup Winner: (2010)
2× Russian Women's League Champion: (2010, 2011)
2× French Women's SuperCup Winner: (2014, 2015)
EuroCup Women Champion: (2016)

French women's national team
2009 EuroBasket Women: 
2011 EuroBasket Women: 
2012 London Summer Olympics: 
2013 EuroBasket Women: 
2015 EuroBasket Women: 
2017 EuroBasket Women:

Individual
2× French Women's League Best Young Player: (2001, 2002)
French Women's Federation Cup Best Player: (2007)
2× French Women's League Best French Player: (2008, 2014)
3× EuroBasket Women All-Tournament Team: (2009, 2013, 2015)
FIBA Europe Women's Player of the Year: (2012)
La Gazzetta dello Sport's European Female Player of the Year: (2012)
French National Order of Merit: (2012)
Radio France's French Sportsman of the Year (2012)
Robert Busnel Medal (highest distinction of the French Basketball Federation): (2013)
French Player of the Year: (2017)
French Women's League Best Five Players 1998-2018: (2018)

Personal life
She is openly lesbian and was the among the 6 French LGBT athletes featured in the documentary We Need to Talk.

References

External links

EuroCup Women profile
Camp Céline Dumerc

French women's basketball players
1982 births
Living people
Atlanta Dream players
Basketball players at the 2012 Summer Olympics
French expatriate basketball people in the United States
Knights of the Ordre national du Mérite
Medalists at the 2012 Summer Olympics
Olympic basketball players of France
Olympic medalists in basketball
Olympic silver medalists for France
Sportspeople from Tarbes
Point guards
French LGBT sportspeople
21st-century French LGBT people